Spooky Tooth were an English rock band originally formed in Carlisle in 1967. Principally active between 1967 and 1974, the band re-formed several times in later years.

History
Prior to Spooky Tooth, four of the band's five founding members had performed in the band Art (formerly known as the V.I.P.'s). Following the dissolution of Art, the members of that band's final line-up (guitarist Luther Grosvenor, vocalist Mike Harrison, drummer Mike Kellie and bassist Greg Ridley) joined forces with American keyboardist/vocalist Gary Wright in October 1967 and formed Spooky Tooth. Wright was introduced to the members of Art by Chris Blackwell, founder of Island Records.

Their debut, It's All About, was released in June 1968 on Island Records and was produced by Jimmy Miller, who was also behind the boards for Spencer Davis Group, Traffic, the Rolling Stones and Blind Faith.

The second album, Spooky Two (March 1969), also produced by Miller, gained some attention in the rock press but, like the debut, failed to sell. It was the last album release by the original lineup and included their now classic version of the Larry Weiss penned "Evil Woman" and "Better by You, Better than Me", which was covered by Judas Priest on their release Stained Class (1978).

Ridley joined Humble Pie in 1969 and was replaced by Andy Leigh for the album Ceremony (December 1969).
The experimental nature of Ceremony received mixed reviews and despite the project being instigated by Gary Wright, the album is considered by him to have ended the band's career.  The record is described by another as being "one of the great screw-ups in rock history".  As Wright describes it, "...We did a project that wasn't our album. It was with this French electronic music composer named Pierre Henry. We just told the label, 'You know this is his album, not our album. We'll play on it just like musicians.' And then when the album was finished, they said, 'Oh no no — it's great. We're gonna release this as your next album.' We said, 'You can't do that. It doesn't have anything to do with the direction of Spooky Two and it will ruin our career.' And that's exactly what happened."

Wright left the band following the release of the album. Harrison, Grosvenor and  Kellie remained and recorded The Last Puff (July 1970) with members of Joe Cocker's Grease Band (guitarist Henry McCullough, keyboardist Chris Stainton and bassist Alan Spenner).

In the autumn of 1970 the band embarked on a European tour that was undertaken with a line-up of Harrison, Grosvenor, Kellie, keyboardist John Hawken (ex-Nashville Teens) and bassist Steve Thompson. After this, the group disbanded, though Harrison and Wright reformed Spooky Tooth in September 1972 with a different line-up.

You Broke My Heart So I Busted Your Jaw was the first album by the reunited band, released in May 1973 on Island Records. Founding guitarist Grosvenor did not rejoin the band, as he had teamed up with Mott the Hoople, adopting the stage name of Ariel Bender. Grosvenor was succeeded by Mick Jones, while founding drummer Kellie was replaced by Bryson Graham. The bassist was Ian Herbert, then Chris Stewart.

For their next album, Witness (November 1973), original drummer Mike Kellie returned in place of Graham. Wright remained the dominant songwriter at this stage of the band's history. But co-lead singer Harrison left following the album's release and Mike Patto was the new vocalist, alongside Wright, when they recorded The Mirror (October 1974), which also included new bass player Val Burke and Bryson Graham back on drums. But the album's failure led to Wright leaving once again for a solo career and the group disbanding in November 1974.

Jon Milward summarized the band in The Rolling Stone Record Guide in 1979: "If ever there was a heavy band, Spooky Tooth had to be it. Featuring two vocalists prone to blues-wrenching extremes, and an instrumental attack comprising awesomely loud keyboards and guitars, Spooky Tooth came on like an overwhelming vat of premedicated goo." Noting their lack of commercial success, Milward concluded that the group "would remain the right band at the wrong time."

After Spooky Tooth 
Mick Jones went on to form Foreigner in 1976.
 
Grosvenor later played with Stealers Wheel and joined Mott the Hoople in the 1970s (replacing Mick Ralphs who left to form Bad Company), adopting the name Ariel Bender. In 2005 he founded the Ariel Bender Band, with which he still occasionally performs. In 2018 and 2019 he toured with a reformed Mott the Hoople.

Kellie later joined the Only Ones in the late 1970s also performing with them in 1980s. The band reformed in 2007.

Ridley became a member of Humble Pie. On 19 November 2003 he died in Alicante, Spain, of pneumonia and resulting complications. He was 62.

Wright began to develop an international solo career in the 1970s and had a hit with the radio-friendly "Dream Weaver".

Harrison, Grosvenor, Ridley and Kellie reunited as Spooky Tooth at points in 1997 and 1998, which resulted in an album, Cross Purpose, released in February 1999.

Harrison played and recorded with the Hamburg Blues Band and appeared on their CD Touch (2002).

In June 2004, Harrison, Wright and Kellie were again re-united as Spooky Tooth with Joey Albrecht (guitar) and Michael Becker (bass) for two concerts in Germany, resulting in a DVD Nomad Poets (2007).

In 2006 Harrison released his first solo album in over thirty years, Late Starter.

In February 2008, the latest incarnation of Spooky Tooth, featuring Harrison, Wright and Kellie, along with guitarist Steve Farris from Mr. Mister and Shem von Schroeck (bass), played a series of European dates. On 29 May 2009, this same lineup (with drummer Tom Brechtlein replacing Kellie) played at Island Records' 50th Anniversary at Shepherd's Bush Empire, before touring Germany that June.

In 2012, Mike Kellie started work on a solo album. Kellie died on 18 January 2017 at the age of 69 after a short illness, and Mike Harrison died on 25 March 2018 at the age of 72.

Media depictions
The band was featured in the 1970 documentary Groupies.

Personnel

Former members

Luther Grosvenor - guitar (1967–70, 1998–99)
Mike Harrison - vocals, keyboards (1967–70, 1972–74, 1998–99, 2004, 2008–09; died 2018)
Mike Kellie - drums (1967–70, 1973–74, 1998–99, 2004, 2008–09; died 2017)
Greg Ridley - bass (1967–69, 1998–99; died 2003)
Gary Wright - keyboards, vocals (1967–70, 1972–74, 2004, 2008–09)
Andy Leigh - bass (1969–70)
Henry McCullough - guitar (1970; died 2016)
Alan Spenner - bass (1970; died 1991)
Chris Stainton - keyboards, guitar, bass (1970)
John Hawken - keyboards (1970)
Steve Thompson - bass (1970)

Bryson Graham - drums (1972–73, 1974; died 1993)
Ian Herbert - bass (1972–73)
Mick Jones - guitar (1972–74)
Chris Stewart - bass (1973–74; died 2020)
Val Burke - bass, vocals (1974)
Mike Patto - vocals, keyboards (1974; died 1979)
Joey Albrecht - guitar (2004)
Michael Becker - bass (2004)
Steve Farris - guitar (2008–09)
Shem von Schroeck - bass (2008–09)
Tom Brechtlein - drums (2009)

Line-ups

Timeline

Discography

Studio albums
 1968: It's All About (re-issued in 1971 as Tobacco Road, with the song "The Weight" replacing "Too Much of Nothing")
 1969: Spooky Two - US #44; Can. #48
 1969: Ceremony (with Pierre Henry) - US #92
 1970: The Last Puff (credited as Spooky Tooth featuring Mike Harrison) - US #84; Can. #70
 1971: Tobacco Road - US #152
 1973: You Broke My Heart So I Busted Your Jaw - US #84; Can. #58
 1973: Witness - US #99
 1974: The Mirror - US #130; Can. #88
 1999: Cross Purpose

Compilations, live and other albums
 1975: The Best of Spooky Tooth (produced by Island Records ILPS9368-A, imported by Jem Records)
 1976: Gary Wright & Spooky Tooth: That Was Only Yesterday - US #172
 1999: The Best of Spooky Tooth: That Was Only Yesterday
 2000: Comic Violence (CD reissue, originally released as The Mirror)
 2001: BBC Sessions
 2007: Nomad Poets - Live in Germany (CD/DVD)
 2009: Lost in My Dream – An Anthology, 1968–1974

Singles
 1967: "The Weight" (cover of The Band's single)
 1968: "Sunshine Help Me" - US Cash Box #126
 1969: "Feelin' Bad" - US Bubbling Under #132
 1970: "I Am the Walrus" - NETH #38
 1974: Fantasy Satisfier/The Hoofer - UK Goodear records EAR607A

References

External links
 Spooky Tooth Fan website www.SpookyTooth.sk
 Spooky Tooth biography, discography, album credits, reviews & releases at AllMusic.com
 
 Spooky Tooth albums to be listened on Spotify
 Spooky Tooth albums to be listened on YouTube

1967 establishments in England
2009 disestablishments in England
A&M Records artists
English blues rock musical groups
English psychedelic rock music groups
Charly Records artists
Island Records artists
Ruf Records artists
Musical groups established in 1967
Musical groups disestablished in 2009